Hiller and Diller is an American sitcom that aired on ABC from September 23, 1997, to March 13, 1998.

Premise
Ted and Neil are two comedy writers with very different lives. Ted has an overachieving daughter among his three children, while Neil has two troublesome teenagers.

Cast
Kevin Nealon as Ted Hiller
Richard Lewis as Neil Diller
Jordan Baker as Jeanne Hiller
Jill Bernard as Allison Hiller
Faryn Einhorn as Lizzie Hiller
Jonathan Osser as Josh Hiller
Kyle Sabihy as Zane Diller
Allison Mack as Brooke Diller
Eugene Levy as Gordon Schermerhorn

Episodes

References

External links

1997 American television series debuts
1998 American television series endings
1990s American sitcoms
English-language television shows
American Broadcasting Company original programming
Television duos
Television series by ABC Studios
Television shows set in Los Angeles
Television series by Imagine Entertainment